|}

The Champion Bumper is a Grade 1 National Hunt flat race in Great Britain which is open to horses aged four to six years. It is run on the Old Course at Cheltenham over a distance of about 2 miles and ½ furlong (2 miles and 87 yards, or 3,298 metres), and it is scheduled to take place each year during the Cheltenham Festival in March.

The event was established in 1992, and it was initially called the Festival Bumper. In its early years it had various sponsors, including the Tote and Guinness. A more sustained period of sponsorship began when Weatherbys began supporting the race in 1997, and since then it has been known by its present title.

The Champion Bumper is the most prestigious flat race, or "bumper", in the National Hunt calendar. It often features horses which go on to become leading performers over obstacles, such as Florida Pearl and Cue Card (horse). Occasionally leading jockeys from Flat racing ride in the race and the 2002 winner, Pizarro, was ridden by Jamie Spencer, a Flat racing jockey.

Records
Leading jockey (3 wins):
 Ruby Walsh – Alexander Banquet (1998), Missed That (2005), Briar Hill (2013)
 Patrick Mullins – Cousin Vinny (2008), Champagne Fever (2012), Facile Vega (2022)

Leading trainer (12 wins):
 Willie Mullins – Wither or Which (1996), Florida Pearl (1997), Alexander Banquet (1998), Joe Cullen (2000), Missed That (2005), Cousin Vinny (2008), Champagne Fever (2012), Briar Hill (2013), Relegate (2018), Ferny Hollow (2020), Sir Gerhard (2021), Facile Vega (2022)

Winners

See also
 Horse racing in Great Britain
 List of British National Hunt races
 Recurring sporting events established in 1992  – this race is included under its original title, Festival Bumper.

References

 Racing Post:
 

 pedigreequery.com – Champion Bumper – Cheltenham.
 racenewsonline.co.uk – Racenews Archive (28 February 2008).

National Hunt races in Great Britain
Cheltenham Racecourse
National Hunt flat races
Recurring sporting events established in 1992
1992 establishments in England